Goodenia amplexans, commonly known as clasping goodenia, is a species of flowering plant in the family Goodeniaceae and endemic to South Australia. It is a small shrub with sticky foliage, egg-shaped to oblong or elliptic, stem-clasping leaves with small teeth on the edges, racemes of yellow flowers with leaf-like bracteoles at the base, and elliptic fruit.

Description

Taxonomy and naming
Goodenia amplexans was first formally described in 1857 by Ferdinand von Mueller in the Transactions of the Philosophical Institute of Victoria from plants growing on "ridges and gullies near Adelaide". The specific epithet (amplexans) means "embracing", referring to the stem-clasping leaves.

Distribution and habitat
Clasping goodenia grows in forest and woodland and on sea cliffs in the southern Flinders Ranges, the Mount Lofty Ranges and Kangaroo Island in South Australia.

References

amplexans
Flora of South Australia
Plants described in 1857
Taxa named by Ferdinand von Mueller